The Mutiny on the Bounty was a mutiny on HMS Bounty that occurred 1789. 

Mutiny on the Bounty may also refer to:
 Mutiny on the Bounty (novel), a 1932 novel by Charles Nordhoff and James Norman Hall
Mutiny on the Bounty (1935 film), a film by Frank Lloyd starring Charles Laughton
 Mutiny on the Bounty (1962 film), a film by Lewis Milestone starring Marlon Brando
 Mutiny on the Bounty (band), a Luxembourgish rock band formed in 2004
Mutiny on the Bounty, a 2008 novel by John Boyne

See also
 A Narrative of the Mutiny on board His Majesty's Ship "Bounty", the account of the 1789 mutiny by William Bligh
"The Mutineers of the Bounty", an 1879 short story by Jules Verne
The Mutiny of the Bounty, a 1916 film by Raymond Longford, starring John Storm
 In the Wake of the Bounty, a 1933 film by Charles Chauvel, starring Errol Flynn and Mayne Lynton
 The Bounty (1984 film), a film by Roger Donaldson starring Anthony Hopkins
 Mutiny on the Bunny, a Looney Tunes cartoon starring Bugs Bunny and Yosemite Sam